The Percival Prentice was a basic trainer of the Royal Air Force in the early postwar period.  It is a low-wing monoplane with a fixed tailwheel undercarriage. Front seating was in a side-by-side configuration with a rear seat provided.

Design and development
Designed to meet Air Ministry Specification T.23/43, the Prentice was the first all-metal aircraft to be produced by the Percival Aircraft Company. The first (of 5) prototype Prentice TV163 first flew from Percival's factory at Luton Airport, Bedfordshire on 31 March 1946.  Early trials revealed lateral instability with inadequate rudder control and poor spin recovery, which required extensive tests with revised tail configurations. These resulted in modifications to the fin, rudder, elevators and upturned wingtips.

An unusual design feature was the provision for three seats. While the instructor and pupil were equipped with dual controls in a side-by-side arrangement in the front, a second pupil sat in the rear seat without controls to receive "air experience". Both pupils could communicate with the instructor. Night flying training was to be carried out in daylight by means of amber screens incorporated into the canopy and the use of special goggles. The amber screens were folded back when not in use.

The RAF ordered a total of 455 Prentices (95 subsequently cancelled) as well as a limited number of export sales. When the Percival factory was concentrating on production of the Percival Proctor and development of the Merganser as the Prince light transport aircraft, production of 125 aircraft was sub-contracted to the Blackburn Aircraft works at Brough.

Operational service
After the above modifications, the Prentice was passed into RAF service, initially with the regular Flying Training Schools (FTS) including the RAF College, Cranwell where they replaced the remaining de Havilland Tiger Moths. Later deliveries went to the Reserve Flying Schools (RFS). The type was used as a pilot trainer until 1952 at the RAF College where it was replaced by the de Havilland (Canada) Chipmunk and in late 1953 at the other schools, when it was replaced by the Percival Provost. Two Air Signals Schools also operated the type to train air signallers, until the last were withdrawn from No.1 ASS at RAF Swanton Morley, Norfolk, in mid 1956.

Civilian operations

252 redundant RAF Prentices were later bought in 1956 by Aviation Traders Ltd, a company owned by Freddie Laker. and were stored at Stansted and Southend. Most were eventually scrapped but 28 were converted for civil use with two seats and two jumpseats behind the two pilots' seats, separated by a structure which housed the original 4-channel radio. This conversion had quite poor performance with four passengers. One aircraft (G-AOKL) was based at Stansted Aerodrome near London around 1963 and used by the Parachute Club for parachuting with at least three jumpers. One aircraft was converted to a seven-seat layout for pleasure flights. One (G-AOPL) was acquired from Shackleton Aviation at Sywell by  Captain Jon Cousens, a Desert Intelligence Officer in the Trucial Oman Scouts and flown to Sharjah in 1967; later being flown on to South Africa where it remained until it ceased flying.

Forty-two aircraft were built under licence by Hindustan Aircraft for the Indian Air Force.

Three fictional civilian Percival Prentice are featured in The Black Island (French: L'Île noire), the 7th volume of The Adventures of Tintin, the comics series by Belgian cartoonist Hergé. The planes are used by money forgers, flying over Sussex and Scotland.

Variants
Prentice T.1
Standard three-seat trainer for Royal Air Force and export.  de Havilland Gipsy Queen 32 engine. 463 built.
Prentice T.2
Fitted with supercharged  Gipsy Queen 51. One built.
Prentice T.3
Fitted with  Gipsy Queen 70-2. 62 built.

Operators

Argentine Air Force – Purchased 100 T.1s, with delivery from September 1948.

Royal Canadian Air Force – One aircraft was evaluated and tested by the RCAF in 1948.

Indian Air Force – Received 20 Percival-built T.3s plus 42 built under licence by Hindustan Aircraft.

Lebanese Air Force – Received 3 T.1s.

Royal Air Force
Central Flying School
No.1 FTS
No.2 FTS
No.3 FTS
No.6 FTS
No.7 FTS
No.22 FTS
No.16 RFS
No.22 RFS
No.23 RFS
No.24 RFS
No.25 RFS

Surviving aircraft

Argentina 
 E-390 – Prentice T.1 on static display at the Museo Nacional de Aeronáutica de Argentina in Morón, Buenos Aires.

India
 IV336 – Prentice T.1 on static display at the Indian Air Force Museum, Palam in New Delhi.

New Zealand
 VS316 – Prentice T.1 on static display at the National Transport and Toy Museum in Wanaka, Otago.

United Kingdom
 VR189 – Prentice T.1 airworthy with private owner at Biggin Hill Airport in London.
 VR192 – Prentice T.1 on display at the Brenzett Aeronautical Museum in Brenzett, Kent.
 VR249 – Prentice T.1 on static display at the Newark Air Museum in Newark-on-Trent, Nottinhamshire.
 VR259 – Prentice T.1 airworthy with Aero Legends in Headcorn, Kent. It was previously owned by the Classic Air Force.
 VS610 – Prentice T.1 under restoration with Neil James Butler of Laurencekirk, Aberdeenshire. It was previously owned by the Shuttleworth Collection.
 VS618 – Prentice T.1 on static display at the Royal Air Force Museum London in London.
 VS621 – Prentice T.1 on static display at the South Yorkshire Aircraft Museum in Doncaster, South Yorkshire.
 VS623 – Prentice T.1 on static display at the Midland Air Museum in Baginton, Warwickshire.

United States
 VS385 – Prentice T.1 in storage with Gabriel A. Lopez of El Monte, California.

Specifications (T.1 - Gipsy Queen 51)

See also

References

Notes

Bibliography

 Birtles, Philip J. "The Percival Prentice". Aircraft Illustrated, Vol. 8, No. 12, December 1975. pp. 487–493.
 Bridgman, Leonard. Jane's All The World's Aircraft 1951–52. London: Sampson Low, Marston & Company, Ltd., 1951.
 Ellison, Norman H. Percivals Aircraft (The Archive Photographs Series). Chalford, Stroud, UK: Chalford Publishing Company, 1997. .
 Halley, J.J. Royal Air Force Aircraft SA100-VZ999. Tonbridge, Kent, UK: Air-Britain (Historians) Ltd. 1985. .
 Jackson, A.J. British Civil Aircraft since 1919, Volume 3. London: Putnam, 1988. .
 Silvester, John. Percival Aircraft 1933–1954 (Parts 1–4). Aeroplane Monthly, Vol. 11, No. 1–4, January–April 1983.
 Silvester, John. Percival and Hunting Aircraft. Leicester: Midland Counties Publications 1987. .
 Sturtivant, Ray. Royal Air Force Flying Training and Support Units. Tonbridge, Kent, UK: Air-Britain (Historians) Ltd, 1997. .
 Thetford, Owen. Aircraft of the Royal Air Force. London: Putnam & Company Ltd., 1976. .

External links

 "Prentice in the Air" a 1948 Flight article

Prentice
1940s British military trainer aircraft
Single-engined tractor aircraft
Low-wing aircraft
Aircraft first flown in 1946